The Board of Amsterdam Museums (OAM) is a board of private and public museums in Amsterdam.
The board became active in the 1980s. All members are registered museums and members of the Dutch Museum Association.
OAM has a chosen chair and vice-chair. The present (2010–present) chair is Michiel Buchel (director NEMO) and the vice-chair is Judikje Kiers (director of Amsterdam Museum and Museum Willet-Holthuysen. The board meets four times a year.

The foundation Samenwerkende Amsterdamse Musea (SAM) represents the collective business interests of the board of OAM. Bjorn Stenvers is the director of SAM.

List of members
The present 44 members are:

References

External links
Amsterdam Museums, official website

Museums in Amsterdam
Museum organizations